Group 4 consisted of four of the 32 teams entered into the European zone: Albania, East Germany, Finland, and Romania. These four teams competed on a home-and-away basis for one of the 9.5 spots in the final tournament allocated to the European zone, with the group's winner claiming the place in the finals.

Standings

Matches

Notes

External links 
Group 4 Detailed Results at RSSSF

4
1972–73 in Albanian football
1973–74 in Albanian football
1972–73 in East German football
1973–74 in East German football
1972 in Finnish football
1973 in Finnish football
1972–73 in Romanian football
1973–74 in Romanian football